William J. Gilboy (March 23, 1876 – ?) was a teacher from Milwaukee, Wisconsin who served one term as a Socialist member of the Wisconsin State Assembly from 1911 to 1912.

Background 

Gilboy was born on a farm near Dundee in Fond du Lac County on March 23, 1876. Early in his life the family moved to a farm in the town of Mitchell, Sheboygan County. His education consisted of local schools, one year in high school and one term at the Oshkosh Normal School. He taught in the local public schools for two years and then moved to Milwaukee around 1900.

Legislative service 

He was elected to the assembly in 1910 to succeed Republican incumbent Otto  in representing the 2nd Milwaukee County district (2nd and 6th wards of the City of Milwaukee), receiving 1,347 votes against 1,165 for Republican Ralph G. Bertschy (Rep.) and 989 for Democrat Jacob Engel. He was assigned to the standing committees on highways and conservation.

In 1912, after redistricting reduced his district to the second ward, he was defeated for re-election by Democrat Thomas A. Manning. In the sixth ward, now the 6th Milwaukee County district, he was succeeded by Democrat A. J. Hedding.

References 

Members of the Wisconsin State Assembly
Politicians from Milwaukee
Socialist Party of America politicians from Wisconsin
University of Wisconsin–Oshkosh alumni
1876 births
Year of death missing
People from Osceola, Fond du Lac County, Wisconsin
People from Sheboygan County, Wisconsin
Schoolteachers from Wisconsin
20th-century American educators
19th-century American educators
20th-century American politicians